Ángel Marquina y Corrales (8 October 1859 - 1 January 1928) was a Spanish prelate of the Roman Catholic church and Bishop of Gaudix.

Biography
Marquina, the son of a farmer, studied at the seminary of San Jerónimo de Burgos and was ordained a priest on 4 June 1887. He was later rector of the seminary from 1888 until 1898. He was appointed bishop of Canarias (the part of the Canary Islands including Gran Canaria, Lanzarote and Fuertaventura) on 18 July 1913 by Pope Pius X. On 6 September 1922, Pope Pius XI appointed him to be Bishop of Gaudix.

Death
He died on 1 January 1928 while serving as Bishop in Guadix, Spain.

See also
 Roman Catholic Diocese of Canarias
 Roman Catholic Diocese of Guadix

References

Spanish Roman Catholic bishops
Bishops appointed by Pope Pius X
1859 births
1928 deaths